Larrañaga is a neighbourhood or Barrio of Montevideo, Uruguay.

Location
This barrio borders Jacinto Vera to the west, Bolívar to the north, Mercado Modelo to the northeast, Unión to the east, La Blanqueada to the southeast and Tres Cruces and La Comercial to the southwest.

Landmarks
Larrañaga is home to the Estadio Gran Parque Central, seat of the football team Club Nacional de Football and the National Television of Uruguay station (former "Canal 5 SODRE"), as well as to the central seat of the Catholic University of Uruguay.

Places of worship
 Parish Church of Our Lady of Sorrows, popularly known as "Tierra Santa", Av. 8 de Octubre 2757 (Roman Catholic)
 St. Paul Methodist Church, Av. Garibaldi 2661 (Methodist)
 Waldensian Evangelical Church, Av. 8 de Octubre 3039 (Waldensian)
 Local Spiritual Assembly, Br. Artigas 2440 (Bahá'í)

Images

See also 
Barrios of Montevideo

References 

 
Barrios of Montevideo